Penicillium islandicum is an anamorph species of the genus of Penicillium which produces luteoskyrin, simatoxin, cyclochlorotine, rugulosin, islanditoxin and chitosanase.

Further reading

References

islandicum
Fungi described in 1912